Bikash Lal Dali (born 9 November 1980) is a Nepalese cricketer. He made his first-class debut in the only first-class cricket match for Nepal against Malaysia in the 2004 ICC Intercontinental Cup scoring 5 runs in the first innings and unbeaten 2 runs in the second innings.

References

External links 

1980 births
Living people
Nepalese cricketers